Steven Nathan Berk (born July 2, 1959) is an American lawyer and former judge. He served as an Associate Judge on the Superior Court of the District of Columbia from 2016 to 2021.

Education and career 
He was born in Chicago and graduated from Niles West High School in 1977. Berk earned his Bachelor of Arts from Washington University in St. Louis in 1981, Master of Science from the London School of Economics in 1982, and J.D. from Boston College Law School in 1985. From 1983 to 2009 he worked in private practice in Chicago, Illinois and Washington, DC. From 1989 to 1992 he was a staff attorney for the United States Securities and Exchange Commission.

From 1990 to 1995, Berk worked in the U.S. Attorney's Office in the District of Columbia as Assistant United States Attorney.

From 2000–2003, he left practicing law to found a social networking site, iHappen. He then returned to practice law and from 2009 to 2016 he served as the principal of Berk Law PLLC.

D.C. Superior Court 
President Barack Obama nominated Berk on November 30, 2015, to a 15-year term as an associate judge on the Superior Court of the District of Columbia to the seat vacated by Harold L. Cushenberry, Jr. On March 2, 2016, the Senate Committee on Homeland Security and Governmental Affairs held a hearing on his nomination. On April 25, 2016, the Committee reported his nomination favorably to the senate floor. The Senate confirmed his nomination on June 23, 2016, by voice vote. He was sworn in on July 29, 2016. He retired involuntarily in accordance with a disciplinary order on November 1, 2021.

Personal life 
Steven Berk is married to Jennifer Chandler Hauge.

References

1959 births
Living people
20th-century American lawyers
21st-century American judges
21st-century American lawyers
Alumni of the London School of Economics
Boston College Law School alumni
Judges of the Superior Court of the District of Columbia
People from Chicago
Washington University in St. Louis alumni